The 2021–22 season is Oxford United's 128th year in their history and sixth consecutive season in League One. Along with the league, the club will also compete in the FA Cup, the EFL Cup and the EFL Trophy. The season covers the period from 1 July 2021 to 30 June 2022.

Transfers

Transfers in

Loans in

Loans out

Transfers out

Pre-season friendlies
Oxford United announced they would play friendlies against Oxford City, Hayes & Yeading United, Banbury United, a double header against Peterborough United and Bristol Rovers as part of their pre-season preparations. A planned fixture against Birmingham City was called off following an outbreak of Covid-19 among the Oxford squad.

Competitions

League One

League table

Results summary

Results by matchday

Matches
Oxford United's fixtures were announced on 24 June 2021.

FA Cup

Oxford were drawn at home to Bristol Rovers in the first round.

EFL Cup

Oxford United were drawn away to Burton Albion in the first round and Queens Park Rangers in the second round.

EFL Trophy

The U's were drawn into Southern Group H alongside Cambridge United, Stevenage and Tottenham Hotspur U21s. On 7 July, the fixtures for the group stage round was revealed.

Appearances and goals

Top scorers

Disciplinary record

See also
2021–22 EFL League One

References

Oxford United
Oxford United F.C. seasons